Palazzo Madama might refer to:
 Palazzo Madama, Rome
 Palazzo Madama, Turin